Muhamad Fikhri bin Zulkiflee (born 22 January 1999) is a Malaysian professional footballer who plays as a forward for Kedah Darul Aman.

Club career

Kedah Darul Aman
On 8 September 2021, Fikhri made his Malaysia Super League debut for the club and scored his first goal.

Career statistics

Club

References

External links
 

1999 births
Living people

Malaysian footballers
Association football forwards
Kedah Darul Aman F.C. players
Malaysia Super League players